Chandidas is a 1934 Hindi social drama film directed by Nitin Bose. The film  was produced by New Theatres Calcutta and was their first big success. It was remake of the 1932 Bengali film of the same name directed by Debaki Bose. This 1934 Hindi version starred K. L. Saigal, Uma Sashi, Pahari Sanyal, Nawab and H. Siddiqui. The music direction was by R. C. Boral with the lyrics written by Agha Hashar Kashmiri. The credit roll of the film states that the film is "Based on the life problems of the poet Chandidas –A problem India has not been able to solve", which involved the caste schism in India. The story revolves around the 15th century poet-saint Chandidas who acts out against the deep-rooted bigotry against caste, untouchoubility and the hypocrisy of society, and a washer woman with whom he falls in love.

Plot
Chandidas (K. L. Saigal), a lover of truth and humanity is the disciple of Acharya (M. Ansari), a priest in the temple. Baiju (Pahari Sanyal), a washer-man lives with his wife and sister Rami (Uma Sashi) in the village where the Zamindar (landowner) Gopinath (Nawab) though outwardly religious and respecting the Brahmins is an evil man. Gopinath has a henchman Sarju (H. Siddiqui) who carries out his dirty work. Rami sweeps the compound of the temple where Chandidas sees her while he carries on his duties in the temple. They fall in love which causes resentment in Gopichand who has been eyeing Rami, but when she spurns his advances he has her kidnapped. His wife comes to the rescue of Rami and helps her escape. The Zamindar goons go after her and assault her. Gopichand convinces the priest that Chandidas should be punished and made to repent for associating with a lower caste woman. Chandidas agrees to this but then sees Rami’s injuries and realises the duplicity of the so-called pious men. He renounces his life in the village and leaves it accompanied by Baiju, his wife and Rami.

Cast
K.L. Saigal as Chandidas
Umasashi as Rami
Pahari Sanyal as Baiju
Nawab as Gopinath
M. Ansari as Acharya
H. Siddiqi as Sarju
Anwaribai
Parvati as Kusum

Music
The music was by R. C. Boral and lyrics by Agha Hashar Kahmiri with the songs sung by K. L. Saigal, Pahari Sanyal and Uma Shashi. The use of a "full-fledged orchestra" was attempted successfully for the first time for this film. The memorable song sung by K. L. Saigal and Uma Shashi, "Prem Nagar Mein Banaoongi Ghar Main" became extremely popular and "won K. L. Saigal nationwide fame".

Songs

References

External links

Full movie on YouTube

1934 films
1930s Hindi-language films
Articles containing video clips
Indian black-and-white films
Indian drama films
1934 drama films
Hindi-language drama films